is a passenger railway station located in the Aioichō neighborhood of the city of Nishinomiya, Hyōgo Prefecture, Japan. It is operated by the private transportation company Hankyu Railway.

Lines

Layout 
The station is an above-ground station with two opposed side platforms for the Kobe Main Line and a single side platform platforms for the Kōyō Line. The Kōyō Line platform extends vertically to the north of the Kobe Main Line platform bound for Osaka. There used to be two lines on the Kōyō Line, but the tracks on the west side have been removed. Each platform is connected by an underground passage. The Kobe Main Line platform straddles the Shukugawa River in part on the east side, and the Kōyō Line platform is located on the west bank of the Shukugawa River. Ticket gates are located in the north and south. There is a bypass between the Kobe Line and the Koyo Line near the north ticket gates, which is used for the trains of the Koyo Line heading to and from Nishinomiya Depot in the east of Nishinomiya-Kitaguchi Station.

Platforms

History 
Shukugawa Station opened on 16 July 1920.

1934 was the start of service on the Koyo Line.

The station was damaged by the Great Hanshin earthquake in January 1995. Restoration work on the Kobe Line took 7 months to complete.

In 2006, the platforms were extended to support 10-car trains.

Station numbering was introduced on 21 December 2013, with Shukugawa being designated as station number HK-09.

Passenger statistics
In fiscal 2019, the station was used by an average of 27,345 passengers daily

Surrounding area
Shukugawa River
Shukugawa Park
Shukugawa Green Town
Otemae University Sakura Shukugawa Campus（大手前大学）
Sakura Shukugawa Station (JR West)
Koroen Station (Hanshin Railway)
Yamate Kansen

Bus stops
Hankyu Shukugawa (Hankyu Bus Co.)
Bus stop 1 (Nishinomiya Route, Nishinomiya Namboku Bus)
Route 1 for Gogaike via Kayandōchō, Jūrin-ji, Nishinomiya Kabutoyama High School, Kabutoyama Cemetery and Kabutoyama Daishi
Route 1 for Nishinomiya Kabutoyama High School via Kayandōchō and Jūrin-ji
Route 2 for Kabutoyam Villa via Kayandōchō, Jūrin-ji, Kabutoyama Cemetery and Nishinomiya Kabutoyama High School
Route 2 for Kabutoyama Cemetery via Kayandōchō and Jūrin-ji
Route 3 for Kentani via Kayandōchō
Sakura-Yamanami Bus for Narai via Kayandōchō, Nishinomiya Kabutoyama High School, Arima Onsen and Sumiredai
Sakura-Yamanami Bus for Hankyu Bus Yamaguchi Office via Kayandōchō, Nishinomiya Kabutoyama High School, Shimo-Yamaguchi, Kita-Rokkodai and Nishinomiya-kita Interchange
Route 1 and 2 for Nishinomiya-Kitaguchi via ,  and 
Route 6 for Nishinomiya-Kitaguchi via , Hanshin Nishonimiya-eki Higashi and JR Nishonimiya-eki Kita (operated on Saturdays)
Route 7 for Nishinomiya-Kitaguchi via JR Sakura Shukugawa, Nishinomiyaebisu Egamichō and JR Nishonimiya (operated on Saturdays)
Sakura-Yamanami Bus for Nishinomiya-Kitaguchi via JR Sakura Shukugawa, Nishinomiyaebisu and JR Nishonimiya
Bus stop 2 (Ashiya Route)
Route 4 for Oimatsuchō, Hinodebashi and Kurakuen
Route 11 for Hankyu Bus Ashiyahama Office via Kurakuen, Hinodebashi, Shiomichō and Wakabachō
Route 13 for Hankyu Bus Ashiyahama Office via Kurakuen, Hinodebashi, JR Ashiya, Hanshin Ashiya, Shiomichō and Wakabachō
Hankyu Shukugawa (Hanshin Bus Co.)
Bus stop 1 (Jūrinji Route)
Route 7 for Shin-Kōyō via Kayandōchō, Jūrin-ji, Nishinomiya Kabutoyama High School, Kabutoyama Cemetery, Kabutoyama Daishi and Kabutoyama Forest Park
Shukugawa Green Town (Minato Kanko)
Route 12  for Rokko Island via  and

See also
List of railway stations in Japan

References

External links

 Shukugawa Station website 

Railway stations in Hyōgo Prefecture
Railway stations in Japan opened in 1920
Hankyū Kōbe Main Line
Nishinomiya